A kōan is a type of text or utterance in Zen Buddhism.

Koan may also refer to:

Japan
 Kōan (Kamakura period), a Japanese era (1278-1288)
 Kōan (Muromachi period), a Japanese era (1361-1362)
 Emperor Kōan, the 6th emperor of Japan
 Kōan (公安), an abbreviation for any of the following public security agencies:
 Public Security Intelligence Agency
 Public Security Examination Commission, part of the Ministry of Justice
 National Public Safety Commission (Japan)

Music
 Koan (program), an algorithmic music software package
 KOAN Sound, a glitch-hop duo
 Koan, an album by Stephan Micus
 Koan, a musical composition by James Tenney

Radio and television stations
 KOAN-LP, a television station in Anchorage, Alaska
 KOAN (AM), a radio station in Anchorage, Alaska
 KVNT, a radio station (1020 AM) licensed to serve Eagle River, Alaska, which held the call sign KOAN from 2009 to 2013

Other uses
 Hacker koan, a humorous anecdote written by hackers about computer science
 Koan or Coan, demonym of the island Kos
 Ministry of Public Security (China)
 White Koan, a modern sculpture at the University of Warwick
 Koan, a software program that works with Cobbler (software)
 Kōan, a member of the Black Moon Clan from Sailor Moon R